TringMe is an Indian internet telephony company based in Bangalore. It focuses on a Flash-based browser client and the related API.

History
It was founded by Yusuf Motiwala & Apul Nahata in 2007, after Yusuf's father complained of downloads required to use VoIP programs. The firm focused on a browser-based app. The duo invested  of their own money initially in the venture. In October 2009, TringMe released a Facebook app. It won the NASSCOM's Most Innovative Startup award in 2009.

See also
 Skype
 Gizmo5

References

External links
 Official website

VoIP companies
Android (operating system) software
IOS software